Mrigendra Pratap Singh was an Indian politician who served as Speaker and Member of Jharkhand Legislative Assembly from Jamshedpur West Assembly constituency and Minister of Finance in Cabinet of Jharkhand.

Personal life 
He was the child of Harihar Singh and elder brother of Amrendra Pratap Singh. He died on March 24, 2005 at Tata Main Hospital.

References 

2005 deaths
Speakers of the Jharkhand Legislative Assembly
Jharkhand MLAs 2000–2005
Bihar MLAs 1985–1990
Bihar MLAs 1995–2000
People from Jamshedpur